Pete Capella  is an American actor, stand-up comedian, producer and artistic director, who is best known for voicing Silver the Hedgehog in the Sonic the Hedgehog video game franchise from 2006 to 2009.

Early life
Pete Capella was born in Red Bank, New Jersey. As a Middletown Township, New Jersey resident, Capella has been acting his whole life. He graduated from college with a BA in Theater and Communications.

Career
In 1993, he became a performer in Improvision Jam Comedy Labs, it was here he got the nickname "The Sniper". He is co-owner and artistic director of the troupe, performing every weekend in Eatontown, New Jersey. Capella has been featured in an array of commercials (for cough medicine and toys such as Dance N Sing Pablo from the Backyardigans).

Capella got his first acting job as Jock in the 1999 film, Big Helium Dog. He would go and appear in more feature films, such as Never Among Friends, Obsession, Road to Marakesh, Chatter and The Night Is Young.

In television, he played Angelo in two episodes of The Subpranos.

As a voice actor, he voiced Nabu in the English dub of Winx Club and most notably for voicing Silver the Hedgehog in the Sonic the Hedgehog video game franchise from 2006 to 2009, the video games include Sonic the Hedgehog, Sonic Rivals, Sonic and the Secret Rings, Sonic Rivals 2, Sonic Riders: Zero Gravity, Sonic and the Black Knight and Mario & Sonic at the Olympic Winter Games.

He also had a recurring role as Tanner Christiansen in the web comedy series, The Most Popular Girls in School. In 2020, he reprised the role as Silver the Hedgehog in the fan-made YouTube audio series, Sonic and Tails R.

Filmography

Film

Television

Video games

Web

Production credits

References

External links
 
 Facebook

Living people
People from Middletown Township, New Jersey
People from Red Bank, New Jersey
American male film actors
American male television actors
American male video game actors
American male voice actors
21st-century American comedians
1977 births